The 1977 Merseyside County Council election took place on 5 May 1977 to elect members of Merseyside County Council in England. This was on the same day as other local elections.

The Conservative Party gained overall control of the council from Labour.

Election results

Overall election result

Overall result compared with 1973.

Results by borough

Knowsley borough

Turnout: 29.8% (1.7%)

Liverpool borough

Turnout: 33.9% (0.5%)

Sefton borough

Turnout: 34.0% (6.0%)

St Helens borough

Turnout: 37.3% (2.9)

Wirral borough

Turnout: 41.8% (0.7)

Ward results

Results compared directly with the last local election in 1973.

Knowsley

Huyton With Roby No. 1 (Huyton Farm-Princess-Woolfall)

Huyton With Roby No. 2 (Longview and Rupert Farm)

Huyton With Roby No. 3 (St Agnes-St Bartholomews-Swanside)

Huyton With Roby No. 4 (St Gabriels and St Michaels)

Kirkby No. 1 (Central and Minstead)

Kirkby No. 2 (Cherryfield and Whitfield)

Kirkby No. 3 (Northwood-Park-Tower Hill-Simonswood)

Prescot

Whiston No. 1 (Croton-Tarbock-Whiston)

Whiston No. 3 (Halewood)

Whiston No. 4 (Knowsley)

Liverpool

Liverpool No. 1 (Abercromby and St James)

Liverpool No. 2 (Aigburth)

Liverpool No. 3 (Allerton)

Liverpool No. 4 (Anfield)

Liverpool No. 5 (Arundel)

Liverpool No. 6 (Breckfield and St Domingo)

Liverpool No. 7 (Broadgreen)

Liverpool No. 8 (Central Everton and Netherfield)

Liverpool No. 9 (Childwall)

Liverpool No. 10 (Church)

Liverpool No. 11 (Clubmoor)

Liverpool No. 12 (County)

Liverpool No. 13 (Croxteth)

Liverpool No. 14 (Dingle)

Liverpool No. 15 (Dovecot)

Liverpool No. 16 (Fairfield)

Liverpool No. 17 (Fazakerley)

Liverpool No. 18 (Gillmoss)

Liverpool No. 19 (Granby and Princes Park)

Liverpool No. 20 (Kensington)

Liverpool No. 21 (Low Hill and Smithdown)

Liverpool No. 22 (Melrose and Westminster)

Liverpool No. 23 (Old Swan)

Picton

Pirrie

St. Mary's

St. Michael's

Sandhills and Vauxhall

Speke

Tuebrook

Warbreck

Woolton East

Woolton West

{{Election box candidate with party link|
  |party      = Conservative Party (UK)
  |candidate  = L. B. Williams
  |votes      = 5,937
  |percentage = 76%
  |change     = 
}}

Sefton

Bootle

    = 

Linacre and Mersey

Netherton-Orrell-Sefton

Central-College-St. John's

Christ Church-St. Mary's-St. Thomas

East and Little Crosby

North and West

Formby

Litherland

Ainsdale-Birkdale-South

Birkdale East-Birkdale North-South

Birkdale West-Central-West

Craven-Sussex-Talbot

Hesketh and Scarisbrick

Marine and Park

West Lancs No. 1

St. Helens

Haydock

Newton-Le-Willows

Rainford

Central and South Eccleston

East Sutton

Hardshaw and West Sutton

Moss Bank and North Windle

North Eccleston and South Windle

Parr

Eccleston and Windle

Rainhill and Bold

Wirral

Higher Bebington and Woodhey

Sunlight-Park-New Ferry-North Bromborough

South Bromborough and Eastham

Lower Bebington-Poulton-Sunlight-South Bromborough

Argyle-Clifton-Holt

Bebington and Mersey

Cathcart-Claughton-Cleveland

Devonshire and Egerton

Gilbrook and St. James

Grange and Oxton

Prenton

Upton

Caldy-Frankby-Grange-Newton-Greasby-South

Central-Hoose-Meols-Park

Leasowe

Marlowe-North Egremont-South Egremont-South

Moreton and Saughall Massie

New Brighton-Wallasey-Warren

North Liscard-Upper Brighton-St. Hilary

North Seacombe-Poulton-Somerville-South

Barnston-Gayton-Heswall-Oldfield

Irby and Thursaton-Irby South-Pensby

Notes

• italics denote the sitting councillor • bold''' denotes the winning candidate

References

1977
1977 English local elections
1970s in Merseyside